David Aubrey Steele (3 June 1869 – 25 March 1935) was an English first-class cricketer, who played for Hampshire and Scotland. Steele was a right-handed batsman who bowled right-arm slow and played occasionally as a wicketkeeper. Steele played as an all-rounder.

Steele began representing Hampshire in 1886, the season after Hampshire lost their first-class status. Steele represented Hampshire in 40 non first-class matches until they regained their first-class status in the 1895 County Championship. Also during this time Steele played for Scotland in two non first-class matches against Gloucestershire.

Steele made his first-class debut for Hampshire in the 1895 County Championship against Leicestershire. Hosie represented the county in 163 first-class matches, with his final match for Hampshire coming against Kent in 1906. In his 163 first-class matches for the county he scored 3,418 runs at a batting average of 13.89, with nine half centuries and a high score of 80 against Leicestershire in 1899. With the ball Steele took 135 wickets at a bowling average of 34.28, with four five wicket hauls and best figures of 5/32 against Somerset in 1897. In the field Steele took 132 catches and made 5 stumpings.

Steele also played a single first-class match for the Gentlemen of the South against the Players of the South in 1903. Additionally, in 1906 Steele made his final appearance for Scotland, in a non first-class match against LC Braund's XI.

Steele died at Caterham, Surrey on 25 March 1935.

External links
David Steele at Cricinfo
David Steele at CricketArchive
Matches and detailed statistics for David Steele

1869 births
1935 deaths
Cricketers from Southampton
English cricketers
Hampshire cricketers
Gentlemen of the South cricketers